Bizanos is a commune in the Pyrénées-Atlantiques department in southwestern France.

Population

Sports 
The home ground of local football club Pau FC, the Nouste Camp, is located in Bizanos.

See also
Communes of the Pyrénées-Atlantiques department
Jean-Michel Larqué

References

Communes of Pyrénées-Atlantiques
Pyrénées-Atlantiques communes articles needing translation from French Wikipedia